Earl of Cranbrook, in the County of Kent, is a title in the Peerage of the United Kingdom, created in 1892 for Gathorne Gathorne-Hardy, Baron Medway. The family seat is Great Glemham House, near Saxmundham, Suffolk. The title remains held by the Gathorne-Hardy family.

Creation and 1st Earl
It was created in 1892 for the prominent Conservative politician Gathorne Gathorne-Hardy, 1st Viscount Cranbrook. He notably held office as Home Secretary, Lord President of the Council, Secretary of State for War and Secretary of State for India. Gathorne-Hardy had already been created Viscount Cranbrook, of Hemsted in the County of Kent, in 1878, and was made Baron Medway, of Hemsted in the County of Kent, at the same time he was given the earldom. The latter title is used as a courtesy title for the Earl's eldest son and heir apparent.

Second earl
Lord Cranbrook's eldest son, the second Earl, represented Rye, Mid Kent and Medway in the House of Commons as a Conservative.

Fourth earl
John David Gathorne-Hardy, 4th Earl of Cranbrook (who was previously married to Bridget D'Oyly Carte). Married Fidelity Seebohm(4), (born in 1912, JP), on 26 July 1932 and had five children: Gathorne, 5th Earl of Cranbrook, 1933-; Hugh 1941-; Juliet 1934-; (Catherine) Sophia 1936-; Christina 1940-

Fifth and current earl
 the titles are held by the latter's great-grandson, the fifth Earl, who succeeded his father in 1978. He is a zoologist and environmental biologist, who was awarded the Royal Geographical Society's Founder's Medal in 1995.

Other members of the family
Hon. Alfred Gathorne-Hardy, third son of the first Earl, sat as a Member of Parliament for Canterbury and East Grinstead. Another member of the family was the writer Jonathan Gathorne-Hardy, a son of Hon. Anthony Gathorne-Hardy, youngest son of the third Earl.

Earls of Cranbrook (1892)

 Gathorne Gathorne-Hardy, 1st Earl of Cranbrook (1814–1906)
 John Stewart Gathorne-Hardy, 2nd Earl of Cranbrook (1839–1911)
 Gathorne Gathorne-Hardy, 3rd Earl of Cranbrook (1870–1915)
 John David Gathorne-Hardy, 4th Earl of Cranbrook (1900–1978)
 Gathorne Gathorne-Hardy, 5th Earl of Cranbrook (b. 1933).

The heir apparent is the present holder's son John Jason Gathorne-Hardy, Lord Medway (b. 1968).

Line of succession

 Gathorne Gathorne-Hardy, 3rd Earl of Cranbrook (1870–1915)
 John David Gathorne-Hardy, 4th Earl of Cranbrook (1900–1978) Dr. Gathorne Gathorne-Hardy, 5th Earl of Cranbrook (b. 1933)
(1). John Jason Gathorne-Hardy, Lord Medway (b. 1968)
(2). Hon. Argus Edward Gathorne-Hardy (b. 1973)
(3). Jack Hector Jarvis Gathorne-Hardy (b. 2006)
(4). Fergus Hawthorne Gathorne-Hardy (b. 2008)
(5). Xan Ralph Gathorne-Hardy (b. 2011)
(6). Hector Max Gathorne-Hardy (b. 2013)
(7). Hon. Hugh Gathorne-Hardy (b. 1941)
(8). Frederick Jasper Gathorne-Hardy (b. 1972)
(9). Alfred Gathorne-Hardy (b. 1978)Hon. Antony Gathorne Gathorne-Hardy (1907–1976)Jonathan Gathorne Gathorne-Hardy (1933–2019)''
(10). Benjamin Gathorne-Hardy (b. 1967)
(11). Samuel Gathorne Gathorne-Hardy (b. 1936)
(12). Robert Dee Gathorne-Hardy (b. 1973)

Notes

References

External links

Earldoms in the Peerage of the United Kingdom
Earl
Earl
Noble titles created in 1892
Noble titles created for UK MPs